Gimme a Break! is a sitcom that aired on NBC from October 29, 1981, to May 12, 1987. There were a total of 137 episodes over the course of 6 seasons.

Series overview

Episodes

Season 1 (1981–82)

Season 2 (1982–83)

Season 3 (1983–84)
 Howard Morton was upgraded to the regular cast after recurring for the first two seasons.
 Joey Lawrence joins the cast starting with "Joey: Part 1."

Season 4 (1984–85)
 Telma Hopkins was promoted to the regular cast after having a recurring role in the third season.
 In the season finale, "Julie's Birthday", Jonathan Silverman joins the cast as Jonathan Maxwell.

Season 5 (1985–86)

Season 6 (1986–87)

References

External links
 
 

Lists of American sitcom episodes